Jackson Township is a township in Nodaway County, in the U.S. state of Missouri.

Jackson Township was erected in 1866, and named after President Andrew Jackson.

References

Townships in Missouri
Townships in Nodaway County, Missouri